Kanagawa Prefectural Assembly is a prefectural assembly of Kanagawa Prefecture.

History
The Kanagawa Prefectural Assembly was established on 22 July 1878 and prefectural rule was established on the basis of the 1878 Prefectural Regulation No.18 (daijō-kan No. 18). For the first assembly, 47 members were elected by registered votes from one district and 15 counties. The term is four years.

Organisation

President and Vice-President

President: Makoto Kunimatsu (LDP), elected from Fujisawa 
Vice-President: Takanori Takita (CDP), elected from Nakahara-ku.

References

Prefectural assemblies of Japan
Politics of Kanagawa Prefecture